Waugh is a surname.

Waugh may also refer to:

Mount Waugh, Antarctica
Waugh Peak, Antarctica
Waugh, Alabama, an unincorporated community
Waugh, Indiana, an unincorporated community in the United States
Waugh Mountain, Colorado